This is a list of Belgian television related events from 1990.

Events
Unknown - Lisa del Bo performing as Dani Klein wins the second season of VTM Soundmixshow.

Debuts

2 September - Samson en Gert (1990–present)

Television shows

1980s
Tik Tak (1981-1991)
VTM Soundmixshow (1989-1995, 1997-2000)

Ending this year

Births
1 December - Eva Daeleman, TV & radio host

Deaths